Kosberg is a small lunar impact crater that is located near the middle of the huge walled plain Gagarin, which lies on the far side of the Moon and cannot be viewed directly from the Earth. Kosberg is a flat-bottomed crater with a circular outer rim, simple sloping inner walls, and a somewhat hummocky interior floor.  Kosberg also lies just to the west of a similarly sized, but deeper and more prominent bowl-shaped crater, Gagarin G.

The nearby crater Balandin (to the northeast and within Gagarin) also has a hummocky floor.

References

External links
LTO-102B3, Lunar Topographic Orthophotomap, Andronov

Impact craters on the Moon